Skif or SKIF may refer to:
 Sergey Kuryokhin International Festival, a music festival in the Kuryokhin Center of Saint Petersburg, Russia
 Skif, an alternative name for the Soviet spacecraft Polyus (spacecraft)
 Skif (ATGM), a Ukrainian anti-tank guided missile system
 Skif PLUS (Skif Dnipropetrovsk Oblast Organization of Scouts), a Ukrainian scouting organization in Dnipropetrovsk Oblast
 SKIF Nizhny Novgorod, a professional ice hockey team in Nizhny Novgorod, Russia
 Skif Paragliding, a Ukrainian paraglider manufacturer
 Skifterat, a nickname of the professional football club KF Gjilani based in Gjilan, Kosovo
 Sotsyalistishe Kinder Farband (S.K.I.F.), a Jewish Socialist political party and the youth organization of the Jewish Labour Bund

See also
 Skiff (disambiguation)